Phyllophoridae is a family of sea cucumbers, marine invertebrates with elongated bodies, leathery skins and feeding tentacles.

Members of the family are characterised by a complex ring of calcareous ossicles arranged in a tube, making a mosaic pattern.  The tentacles number ten to twenty-five. Some members have spindle-shaped bodies whilst others are buried in the substrate and adopt a U-shaped form.

Genera
The following genera are recognised in the family Phyllophoridae:
Allothyone Panning, 1949
Anthochirus Chang, 1948
Cladolella Heding & Panning, 1954
Ekmanothyone Massin, 1993
Hemithyone Pawson, 1963
Lipotrapeza Clark, 1938
Massinium Samyn & Thandar, 2003
Neopentadactyla Deichmann, 1944
Neothyonidium Deichmann, 1938
Pentadactyla Hutton, 1878
Pentamera Ayres, 1852
Phyllophorella Heding & Panning, 1954
Phyllophorus Grube, 1840
Phyllostauros O'Loughlin in O'Loughlin, Barmos & VandenSpiegel, 2012
Phyrella Heding & Panning, 1954
Pseudoplacothuria Yamana & Kohtsuka, 2018
Selenkiella Heding & Panning, 1954
Stolus Selenka, 1867
Thorsonia Heding, 1940
Thyone Oken, 1815
Thyonina Thandar, 1990
Triasemperia O'Loughlin in O'Loughlin et al., 2014

References

 
Echinoderm families